Imad Zatara (Arabic: عماد زعترة; born on 1 October 1984) is a Palestinian former professional footballer who played as a forward.

Club career

Early career
Zatara began his career in FC Inter Orhoy, a club famous for bringing players like Gabriel Özkan and Henok Goitom.

Vasalund and Essinge IF
Zatara spent his first six seasons on senior level at Stockholm based Essinge IK (who was merged with Vasalunds IF in 2003 creating Vasalund/Essinge IF making his debut only 17 years old. It did not take long for Zatara to evolve into one of the most important players of the team and one of the most coveted players of Swedish third level.

IF Brommapojkarna
In 2007 Zatara finally took the final step making his debut on the highest level of Swedish football when moving to another Stockholm based club, IF Brommapojkarna who were about to play their first season ever in Allsvenskan. Unfortunately the team struggled in the bottom of the table and at the end of the season the team got relegated to Superettan. Imad did not get many chances in the starting eleven and often had to sit on the bench.

Zalaegerszegi TE
After about a week long trial in early 2008 Zatara got a contract with Hungarian club Zalaegerszegi TE. He soon became an important player of the team and scored three goals in 12 appearances as the club finished 7th in Nemzeti Bajnokság I.

Syrianska FC
Zatara signed with Södertälje based Syrianska FC in early 2009 after being a very coveted name among the Stockholm-based clubs. He spent two seasons with the club and was consistently a very important part of the team who finished on 4th place of Superettan in 2009. He was also part of the side that would secure promotion to the Allsvenskan in 2010, he turned in several key performances the following year allowing the club to retain its top-flight status.

Nîmes
In February 2010 Zatara signed a loan deal with French Ligue 2 club Nîmes Olympique. He made his debut against Le Havre on 12 February 2010 and also managed to score his first and only goal during his time in the club. He scored the equaliser in the 87th minute of a game that mainly will remembered for the nine yellow and two red cards that were delivered in the game. Zatara played six games for the club and returned to Syrianska FC after the season.

Sanat Naft
On 23 December 2011, he signed a six-month contract with Iran Pro League side, Sanat Naft, becoming the first Palestinian to play in Iran.

Åtvidabergs FF
On 26 July 2012, Zatara returned to Sweden with newly promoted Allsvenskan side Åtvidabergs FF. In 2013 Zatara scored nine goals making him the second top scorer in the Allsvenskan, behind fellow Palestinian Imad Khalili.

Later career
Zatara moved to Omani club Sur SC in 2018.

International career
Zatara early took the decision to play for his native country Palestine. The debut came in 2004 in the 4–1 defeat against Iraq, in which Zatara scored his first international goal. He was also called up for Palestine in 2010. Zatara captained the national team for the first time in a friendly against the Malaysia.

International goals
Scores and results list Palestine's goal tally first, score column indicates score after each Zatara goal.

Personal life
On 30 January 1992, Imad Zatara's father Hasan Zatara was the last known victim of John Ausonius, in Swedish media known as Lasermannen ("the Laser Man"), until 2016. Hasan survived but was blinded in his right eye and lost the ability to speak.

References

External links
Profile at PersianLeague

1984 births
Living people
Palestinian footballers
Association football midfielders
Palestine international footballers
Footballers from Stockholm
Swedish people of Palestinian descent
Allsvenskan players
Superettan players
Ligue 2 players
Qatari Second Division players
Essinge IK players
Vasalunds IF players
IF Brommapojkarna players
Zalaegerszegi TE players
Syrianska FC players
Nîmes Olympique players
Sanat Naft Abadan F.C. players
Åtvidabergs FF players
AFC Eskilstuna players
Al-Ahli Club (Manama) players
Mesaimeer SC players
Nemzeti Bajnokság I players
Palestinian expatriate footballers
Palestinian expatriate sportspeople in Hungary
Expatriate footballers in Hungary
Palestinian expatriate sportspeople in France
Expatriate footballers in France
Palestinian expatriate sportspeople in Iran
Expatriate footballers in Iran
Palestinian expatriate sportspeople in Bahrain
Expatriate footballers in Bahrain
Expatriate footballers in Qatar
Palestinian expatriate sportspeople in Oman
Expatriate footballers in Oman